Decaisnea fargesii, the blue sausage fruit, blue bean shrub or dead men's fingers, is a member of the family Lardizabalaceae, and is native to Nepal, Tibet and China. It is a deciduous shrub which grows to 4 m tall and broad, but may achieve  eventually.

But its main attraction is the pendent bean-like pods which appear in autumn, and are an unusual blue-grey colour.

The species was first described in 1892 by the French botanist Adrien René Franchet.

Both the online Flora of China and Global Biodiversity Information Facility (GBIF) do not consider this a separate species from Decaisnea insignis, but Plants of the World Online does.

See also
Meiogyne cylindrocarpa (fingersop)

References

Lardizabalaceae
Flora of Nepal
Flora of China
Flora of Tibet
Taxa named by Adrien René Franchet
Plants described in 1892